Mihai Nedef (November 8, 1931 – 10 June 2017) was a Romanian basketball player who competed in the 1952 Summer Olympics. He was born in Bucharest. He was part of the Romanian basketball team, which was eliminated in the first round of the 1952 tournament. He played both matches. He died on 10 June 2017.

References

External links

 FIBA Profile

1931 births
2017 deaths
Basketball players at the 1952 Summer Olympics
Olympic basketball players of Romania
Romanian men's basketball players
Basketball players from Bucharest
Stade Français basketball coaches